Je n'aime pas le classique, mais ça j'aime bien! (literally "I don't like classical music, but this I really like" in French) is a successful series of compilation albums of classical music interpreted by various artists. They were released on RCA / Sony BMG. The set was favourably reviewed by RTL's "classics" radio presenter  Charlotte Latour.

Related jazz series
After the success of the classics series, a jazz series was released in December 2013

References

Classical albums
Compilation album series